WOH S279 is a red supergiant located in the constellation of Dorado. It is currently among the largest known stars with an radius of about 1,300 solar radii. If placed at the center of the solar system, its photosphere would engulf the orbit of Jupiter.

See also 
 WOH G17
 WOH G64
 WOH S140 (HV 888)
 WOH S281
 List of largest stars

Notes

References 

Dorado (constellation)
M-type supergiants
Extragalactic stars
Large Magellanic Cloud
TIC objects